Borgomasino is a comune (municipality) in the Metropolitan City of Turin in the Italian region Piedmont, located about  northeast of Turin.

Among the sites are the Parish Church of Santissimo Salvatore designed by Bernardo Vittone and the castle.

References

External links
 Tourist guide